1013 Tombecka (prov. designation:  or ) is a metallic Mitidika asteroid from the central regions of the asteroid belt, approximately 34 kilometers in diameter. It was discovered on 17 January 1924, by Russian-French astronomer Benjamin Jekhowsky at the Algiers Observatory in North Africa. The asteroid was named after the secretary of the Faculty of Sciences of Paris, D. Tombecka.

Orbit and classification 

Tombecka is a member of the Mitidika family, a small asteroid family of carbonaceous asteroids in the central main belt named after 2262 Mitidika. It has also been described generically as a stony Eunomian asteroid.

The asteroid orbits the Sun in the central main-belt at a distance of 2.1–3.2 AU once every 4 years and 5 months (1,606 days). Its orbit has an eccentricity of 0.21 and an inclination of 12° with respect to the ecliptic. The body's observation arc begins at Heidelberg in 1931, approximately 7 years after its official discovery observation at Algiers.

Naming 

This minor planet was named after D. Tombeck, secretary of the Faculty of Sciences of Paris. The official naming citation was mentioned in The Names of the Minor Planets by Paul Herget in 1955.

Physical characteristics

Spectral type 

Tombecka has been characterized as a metallic M-type asteroid by the Wide-field Infrared Survey Explorer (WISE). It has also been described as an Xk subtype, that transitions from the X-type to the K-type asteroids. In the Tholen classification, a determination of Tombeckas spectral type was inconclusive: numerical analysis of the asteroid's colors was closest to an X-type (which includes the M-type in this taxonomy), as well as in the vicinity of the C- and S-type asteroids.

Diameter and albedo 

According to the surveys carried out by the Infrared Astronomical Satellite IRAS, the Japanese Akari satellite and the NEOWISE mission of NASA's WISE telescope, Tombecka measures between 31.93 and 36.62 kilometers in diameter and its surface has an albedo between 0.120 and 0.1552.

The Collaborative Asteroid Lightcurve Link adopts the results obtained by IRAS, that is, an albedo of 0.1552 and a diameter of 31.93 kilometers based on an absolute magnitude of 10.12.

Mass and density 

Tombecka  has a determined mass of  kilograms and a high (metallic) density of 7.50 g/cm3 with no porosity at all. The results correspond to an overall mean-diameter of 35.18 kilometers.

Rotation period and poles 

In 1986, several rotational lightcurves of Tombecka were obtained from photometric observations. Lightcurve analysis gave a rotation period between 6.0 and 6.0508 hours with a brightness variation of 0.35 to 0.50 magnitude.

In 2006, an international study modeled a lightcurve with a concurring period of 6.05017 hours and determined a spin axis of (4.0°, 62.0°) in ecliptic coordinates (λ,β).

Notes

References

External links 
 Asteroid Lightcurve Database (LCDB), query form (info )
 Dictionary of Minor Planet Names, Google books
 Asteroids and comets rotation curves, CdR – Observatoire de Genève, Raoul Behrend
 Discovery Circumstances: Numbered Minor Planets (1)-(5000) – Minor Planet Center
 
 

001013
001013
Discoveries by Benjamin Jekhowsky
Named minor planets
001013
19240117